McLenahan is a surname. Notable people with the surname include:

Hugh McLenahan (1909–1988), English footballer
Roland McLenahan (1921–1984), Canadian ice hockey player

See also
McClenahan
McLenaghan